Litothallus is a genus of non-marine thalloid organism found in overbank deposits from the Triassic of Antarctica. It looks a bit like Hildenbrandia, and was composed of up to 15 layers of non-mineralized cellular sheets.

References

Triassic life